A digon, in mathematics, is a polygon with two vertices.

Digon or Digons may also refer to:

Places 
Digon, a small municipality in Margosatubig, Zamboanga del Sur, the Philippines
Digon valley, a valley in Comelico, Italy
Digons or Bigons, an estate acquired by English lawyer and politician Nicholas Barham in 1554

People 
John Digons (1500 or 1501–1585), English politician
Matúš Digoň (born 1988), Slovak footballer
Josep Digón i Balaguer (1954-1995), a leader of the Catalan Liberation Front separatist group
Roberto Digón (born 1935), Argentine politician - see Noemí Rial

Other uses 
Digon, a trade name of digoxin, a medication